Flowey is a fictional character and the main antagonist of Undertale, a role-playing video game created by Toby Fox. He appears for most of the game as a side character with a sadistic and psychopathic personality. It is later revealed that he is a soulless resurrection of Asriel Dreemurr, a young monster prince who was killed by humans. Critics and fans have praised Flowey's characterization, well-constructed backstory, and boss fights involving the character.

History and appearances 
The player first encounters Flowey, who appears as an unassuming flower with a face in the middle, at the very start of the game. He attacks the player under the pretense of being a helpful monster who will award the player with "friendliness pellets", which are actually harmful bullets. He also tells the player to level up by increasing their LOVE, which unbeknownst to the player stands for "level of violence", therefore in actuality encouraging violence against other monsters, stating his philosophy "KILL or BE killed". He is chased away by Toriel before he can kill the player, only returning after the player has fought her. Flowey judges you on your encounter with them depending on if you spared Toriel or killed her.

Following the player throughout the game, Flowey returns after the fight against Asgore, finishing him off if the player tries to spare him, to get him out of the way in order to obtain the collected human souls. Using the power of the souls, he becomes Photoshop Flowey (also known as Omega Flowey) and takes on a gigantic, hideous form, depicted in an uncanny artstyle similar to Donkey Kong Country, with unsettling sound and imagery; clashing with the rest of the game's 8-bit style. When the player defeats him, he tells the player to complete the game without collecting any EXP, if he is spared, precipitating the game's "True Pacifist Route", if the player has not done so already.

Asriel Dreemurr 
Upon reaching the New Home area nearing the endgame of a Neutral or Pacifist run, random encounters in which the enemies tell the player about Asriel and Chara's history occur. When the player reaches the True Lab area of the game (which can only be accessed in a "pacifist" run in which the player spares every monster and boss that they come across) they learn the origins of Flowey—that he was the only biological son of Toriel and Asgore, being named Asriel, a combination of both of their names. An only child, Asriel became best friends with Chara, the first fallen human. Chara devised a plan to attempt suicide by eating poisonous flowers, combining their soul with Asriel's and breaking through the barrier that kept monsters trapped in the Underground, rendering them free to reach the surface. Upon the execution of this plan, Asriel transformed into a powerful, monstrous being due to absorbing Chara's soul from his corpse. As the control of the body was shared between Chara and Asriel, Chara took their own body to the human village and laid it upon a bed of flowers in its center. Unfortunately, the fusion of the two was attacked by the humans who believed Asriel had killed Chara, upon seeing their body. Chara tried to fight back but Asriel resisted them and walked away. The humans mortally wounded Asriel and Chara, upon returning home, he collapsed, turning into dust, which scattered over a bed of golden flowers in Asgore's throne room. Asriel's consciousness was restored as a sentient flower as a result of scientific experimentation from the royal scientist Alphys, who injected a flower with "determination" as part of a larger series of experiments on the nature of the substance, with unbeknownst to her, the flower still having some amount of Asriel's dust on it. In the "no mercy" (popularly called "Genocide") route of the game (which involves killing every enemy across all of the areas as well as all of the bosses), upon reaching New Home, in a similar fashion to Asriel's and Chara's story in the Neutral run, Flowey tells the story of how he awakened as a flower and reunited with his parents, before realising that he no longer had the ability to feel love or attachment, due to no longer possessing a soul. He attempted suicide, after which he realised that he now had the ability to "SAVE" and "RESET" time due to the "determination" he had been given.

At the end of the True Pacifist route, Flowey retakes the souls of the fallen humans and absorbs the souls of all the monsters of the underground to take the form of an all-powerful older Asriel. Asriel, mistakenly thinking the playable character Frisk is Chara, wants them to keep playing with him over and over, fearing losing them again. Frisk "SAVES" Asriel and reaches out to him, leading the monster to emotionally break down and admit his insecurity and loneliness. Asriel regains his empathy and reverts to his original appearance as a child. He apologizes for his misdeeds and uses his power to break the barrier, thus freeing the monsters. He ultimately reverts to Flowey due to releasing the souls of the humans and monsters, once again losing the ability to feel love. In game, it's ambiguous as to whether Flowey leaves the Underground with the others, but fan speculation and certain supplemental media suggests that he does.

Towards the end of the "no mercy" route of the game, Flowey flees to warn Asgore of the player's cruelty. The player encounters Flowey pleading to Asgore in his throne room, and without player input, the playable character mortally wounds Asgore. Flowey finishes off Asgore to prove his loyalty to the player, but realises that he may be the player's final target, and begs for mercy, saying that he can be helpful and will not make a mistake again, revealing himself to be Asriel by mimicking his former face and voice. He is ultimately hacked to pieces, again without any player input, after which Chara appears to the player and, after a monologue about the player's destructive actions in which they mention how the player's actions made them realise that their purpose in life is power, destroys the world.

Deltarune
In Deltarune, which takes place in a different universe than Undertale, albeit featuring many characters who first appeared in that game, Asriel appears as the older brother of Kris, the main protagonist, and the first son of Toriel and Asgore, and is said to be away attending college. When Kris and their classmate Susie enter the Dark World, they meet Ralsei, a prince from the dark whose appearance and personality are similar to that of Asriel. At the end of the first chapter, before Kris and Susie leave the Dark World, Ralsei reveals his true appearance, previously cloaked in shadow under his wide-brimmed pointy hat, which heavily resembles Asriel's appearance in Undertale. Additionally, Ralsei's name is an anagram of Asriel.

Reception 
Flowey has received generally positive reception. Flowey was a runner-up for USGamer's best characters of 2015, citing his knowledge of everything the player "has been up to", which may leave the player "a little stunned." USGamer also called the older Asriel "exactly the kind of thing a suffering pre-teen would design if they had possession of God's own wrath." Game Informer called Flowey one of the top 10 fourth wall breaking moments in games, calling him a "crazed talking flower". Zack Furniss of Destructoid stated that the battle against Flowey was one of his favorite gaming moments of 2015, saying that while he was apprehensive about playing the game, the fact that "a small flower ends up being a Photoshopped monster that can destroy in seconds", "sold" him on the game. Calling Photoshop Flowey "wonderfully disturbing", he called the boss and how it affected the player's save file what would stay with him the longest. Flowey placed 7th on a 2018 list of the best villains in video games published by GamesRadar, with staff noting that Flowey seems innocuous upon first impression, but turns out to be a manipulative and terrifying antagonist, and his final form "the stuff of nightmares".

Jason Schreier of Kotaku called the fight against Flowey's true form as Asriel "one of the greatest final boss fights in RPG history", saying that it rivaled "games like EarthBound and Chrono Trigger in sheer, gut-wrenching poignancy." Stating that he has "one hell of a theme song", he praised the entire fight sequence as "spectacular", saying that it "justifies even the slowest of Undertale's setups". Thegamer ranked Flowey as the 8th best character among the main cast, opining that his fight is "one of the most intense boss battles in modern gaming history".

References 

Anthropomorphic video game characters
Fictional characters who break the fourth wall
Fictional characters who can change size
Fictional characters with immortality
Fictional monsters
Fictional patricides
Male characters in video games
Plant characters
Prince characters in video games
Child characters in video games
Undertale
Video game bosses
Video game characters introduced in 2015
Fictional regicides
Video game characters who use magic
Fictional characters granted magic or power through dealings
Counterparts to the protagonist
Male video game villains
Fictional amorphous creatures
Fictional characters with plant abilities
Genetically engineered characters in video games
Fictional characters displaced in time
Shapeshifter characters in video games
Fictional characters who can manipulate time
Fictional characters who can manipulate reality
Fictional criminals in video games
Fictional assassins in video games
Vigilante characters in video games
Hackers in video games
Fictional hunters in video games
Video game supervillains
Fictional slaves in video games
Fictional artists in video games
Fictional martial artists in video games
Fictional mercenaries in video games
Fictional henchmen in video games
Ghost characters in video games
Fictional warlords in video games
Video game sidekicks
Fictional unemployed people
Fictional socialites
Fictional scribes
Fictional explorers in video games
Fictional spiritual mediums
Fictional sole survivors
Fictional characters with alter egos
Fictional writers
Fictional characters who have made pacts with devils
Fictional characters with giftedness
Fictional characters with mental disorders
Fictional tricksters
Fictional terrorists
Fictional male martial artists